Robert Smith or Bob Smith, or similar, may refer to:

Business 
 Robert MacKay Smith (1802–1888), Scottish businessman, meteorologist and philanthropist who founded Glasgow University's Mackay Smith Prizes 
 Robert Barr Smith (1824–1915), Australian businessman and philanthropist
 Robert Hall Smith (1888–1960), American railroad executive who was president of the Norfolk and Western Railway, 1946–1958
 Robert H. Smith (philanthropist) (1928–2009), American builder and developer who developed much of the Crystal City, Virginia neighborhood just south of Washington, D.C.
 Robert P. Smith (philanthropist) (1940–2019), American financial pioneer, philanthropist and author
 Robert F. Smith (investor) (born 1962), American businessman and investor; founder, chairman, and CEO of Vista Equity Partners

Entertainment

Acting
 Robert Wilton Smith (1881–1957), known as Robb Wilton, English comedian and comic actor
 Robert Smith (American actor) (1912–2001), American actor
 Robert Grant Smith (1914–2001), American aeronautical engineer and actor after whom the R.G. Smith Award is named
 Robert O. Smith (1942–2010), American voice actor
 Robert Smith (Canadian actor) (1966–2020), Canadian actor and voice actor

Music
 Robert Archibald Smith (1780–1829), Scottish composer, known for his collection Scotish [sic] Minstrel, a selection from the vocal melodies of Scotland ancient and modern
 Robert Bache Smith (1875–1951), American librettist and lyricist
 Robert Curtis Smith (1930–2010), American Piedmont blues singer, guitarist and songwriter
 Bobby Smith (rhythm and blues singer) (1936–2013), American musician, lead singer of the (Detroit) Spinners
 Robert Weston Smith (1938–1995), known as Wolfman Jack, American disc jockey famous for his gravelly voice
 Bob Smith (1942–1991), founder, singer, keyboardist and drummer for Cat Mother & the All Night Newsboys
 Robert Dean Smith (born 1956), American operatic tenor
 Robert W. Smith (musician) (born 1958), American composer, arranger and teacher
 Robert Smith (musician) (born 1959), English musician, lead singer and guitarist of The Cure
 Robert L. Smith (recording engineer) (born 1965), American recording engineer and record producer in New York City
 Rob Smith (Irish musician) (born 1982), Irish singer-songwriter and DJ
 Rob Smith (British musician), English contemporary DJ, musician, and remixer
 Rob Sonic, American rapper and record producer

Writing 

 Robert Paul Smith (1915–1977), American author, most famous for his classic evocation of childhood, Where Did You Go? Out. What Did You Do? Nothing. 
 Robert W. Smith (writer) (1926–2011), American martial artist and historian
 Robert Kimmel Smith (1930–2020), American novelist and children's author
 Bob Smith (born 1941), American author who wrote the memoir Hamlet's Dresser
 Robert Rowland Smith (born 1965), British lecturer and writer on philosophy, literature, and psychoanalysis
 Rob Magnuson Smith, British-American novelist, short story writer, and university lecturer

Other entertainment
 Robert Emil Schmidt (1917–1998), nicknamed Buffalo Bob Smith, American host of TV show Howdy Doody
 Bob Smith (comics) (born 1951), American comic book inker
 Bob Smith (comedian) (1958–2018), American comedian and author
 Normal Bob Smith (born 1969), American graphic artist, writer, and atheist activist
 Robert Farrell Smith (born 1970), American humorist, who writes children's books under the name Obert Skye
 Bob Smith (Atari), American video game developer and producer
 Bob Kupa'a Smith (1928–2020), American host of the television show Wordsmith

Military

 Robert A. Smith (1814–1879), birth name of British soldier and churchwarden Robert Smith-Dorrien

 Robert Smith (Medal of Honor) (1847–1930), American Indian Wars soldier and Medal of Honor recipient

 Robert Smith (Australian Army officer) (1881–1928), Australian wool merchant and army officer
 Robert H. Smith (naval officer) (1898–1943), submariner in the United States Navy, for whom the destroyer/minelayer  the USS Robert H. Smith was named
 Robert T. Smith (1918–1995), American World War II flying ace

Politics

Australia
 Robert Murray Smith (1831–1921), politician in colonial Victoria and Agent-General for Victoria (Australia)
 Robert Burdett Smith (1837–1895), solicitor and politician in colonial New South Wales
 Robert Harrison Smith (1848–1911), member of both the Queensland Legislative Council and the Queensland Legislative Assembly
 Bob Rowland Smith (1925–2012), National Party member of the New South Wales Legislative Council
 Bob Smith (Australian politician) (born 1948), Labor member of the Victorian Legislative Council

Canada
 Robert Smith (Ontario politician) (1819–1900), Canadian Member of Parliament for Peel, Ontario
 Robert Smith (Canadian judge) (1858–1942), Canadian Member of Parliament for Stormont, Justice of the Supreme Court of Canada
 Robert Smith (Newfoundland politician) (1879–1972), Newfoundland politician and merchant
 Robert Smith (British Columbia politician), Irish-born Member of the Legislative Assembly of the Canadian province of British Columbia 1871–1878
 Robert Black Smith (1872–1931), Member of the Legislative Assembly of New Brunswick 1917–1925
 Robert Knowlton Smith (1887–1973), Canadian Member of Parliament for Cumberland 1925–1935
 Robert Melville Smith (1887–1950), deputy minister of the Department of Highways of Ontario 1934–1943

United Kingdom
 Robert Smith (MP for Wycombe),  Member of Parliament (MP) for Wycombe from 1318 to 1322
 Robert Smith (MP for Derby), Member of Parliament (MP)  for Derby in 1420 and 1421
 Robert Smith (MP for Devizes) (fl. 1414–1421), Member of Parliament (MP)  for Devizes in April 1414 and May 1421
 Robert Smith (fl. 1545), Member of Parliament (MP) for Carlisle in 1545
 Robert Smith, 1st Baron Carrington (1752–1838), Member of Parliament (MP) for Nottingham 1779–1796
 Robert Percy Smith, known as "Bobus" Smith (1770–1845), British lawyer and Member of Parliament for Grantham 1812–1818 and for Lincoln 1820–1826
 Robert Vernon, 1st Baron Lyveden (1800–1873), known as Robert Vernon Smith until 1859, British Liberal Party politician who was Member of Parliament for Tralee 1829–1831 and for Northampton 1831–1859
 Sir Robert Smith, 1st Baronet (1880–1957), Scottish Unionist politician, Member of Parliament (MP) for Aberdeen and Kincardine Central 1924–1945
 Sir Robert Smith, 3rd Baronet (born 1958), Liberal Democrat politician, Member of Parliament (MP) for West Aberdeenshire and Kincardine 1997–2005

United States
 Robert Smith (Cabinet member) (1757–1842), Secretary of State and of the Navy
 Robert Barnwell Smith (1800–1876), known as Robert Barnwell Rhett, U.S. Senator and Representative from South Carolina
 Robert Smith (Illinois politician) (1802–1867), U.S. Representative from Illinois
 Robert Hardy Smith (1813–1878), Alabama politician who was a senior officer of the Confederate States Army during the American Civil War 
 Robert Burns Smith (1854–1908), governor of Montana
 Robert Lloyd Smith (1861–1942), educator, businessman, and politician in the Texas Legislature
 Robert B. Smith (Virginia mayor), mayor of Newport News, Virginia 1956–1958
 Robert Freeman Smith (1931–2020), U.S. Representative from Oregon
 Robert L. Smith (politician) (born 1931), Republican politician from Idaho
 Bob Smith (New Hampshire politician) (born 1941), U.S. Senator from New Hampshire
 Bob Smith (New Jersey politician) (born 1947), New Jersey state senator
 Robert J. Smith II (born 1963), American attorney and New Jersey state legislator

Religion
 Robert Smith (bishop) (1732–1801), the first American Episcopal bishop of the Diocese of South Carolina
 Robert Payne Smith (1818–1895), Regius Professor of Divinity at the University of Oxford and Dean of Canterbury
 Robert Pearsall Smith (1827–1899), lay leader in the Holiness movement in the United States and the Higher Life movement in the United Kingdom
 Robert H. Smith (theologian) (1932–2006), American Lutheran clergyman, theologian, author and lecturer
 Robert Smith (priest) (1932–2010), American Catholic priest, author, and educator

Science
 Robert William Smith (surgeon) (1807–1873), Irish surgeon and pathologist
 Robert Angus Smith (1817–1884), Scottish chemist, discoverer of acid rain
 Robert Murdoch Smith (1835–1900), Scottish engineer, archaeologist and diplomat
 Robert Smith (surgeon) (1840–1885), Sierra Leonean medical doctor
 Bob Smith (doctor) (1879–1950), American physician and surgeon who co-founded Alcoholics Anonymous
 Robert Allan Smith (1909–1980), Scottish physicist
 Robert Smith (aerospace engineer), American business executive and aerospace engineer

Sports

American football or Canadian football
 Bob Smith (defensive back, born 1925) (1925–2002), American football defensive back
 Bob Smith (fullback) (1929–2005), American football fullback
 Bob Smith (halfback) (born 1933), American football halfback
 Bobby Smith (safety) (born 1938), American football defensive back
 Bob Smith (American football coach) (born 1940), college football coach
 Bobby Smith (running back) (born 1942), American football running back
 Bob Smith (defensive back, born 1945), American football defensive back
 Rob Smith (American football, born 1957), college football coach
 Rob Smith (Canadian football) (born 1958), Canadian football offensive lineman
 Robert Smith (defensive end) (born 1962), American football defensive end
 Robert Smith (running back) (born 1972), American football running back
 Rob Smith (American football, born 1984), American football player
 Robert Smith (safety) (born 1992), American football safety
 Robbie Smith (Canadian football) (born 1997), Canadian football defensive lineman

Association football
 Robert Smith (footballer, born 1848) (1848–1914), Scottish international footballer
 Robert Smith (Darwen footballer), English footballer for Darwen in the 1890s
 Bobby Smith (footballer, born 1870), English footballer who played one game for Stoke City F.C.
 Bobby Smith (footballer, born 1900s), Scottish footballer
 Robert Smith (footballer, born 1912), English football player and manager of Ajax Amsterdam
 Bob Smith (footballer) (born 1923), English professional footballer
 Bobby Smith (footballer, born 1933) (1933–2010), English footballer for Tottenham Hotspur
 Bobby Smith (Irish footballer) (1922–1992), football player for Bohemians
 Bobby Smith (Canadian soccer) (born 1940), Canadian soccer player
 Bobby Smith (footballer, born 1941) (1941–2019), English footballer for Barnsley F.C. and Chelmsford City F.C.
 Bobby Smith (footballer, born 1944), English footballer and manager
 Rob Smith (footballer, born 1950), English footballer
 Bobby Smith (American soccer) (born 1951), American soccer player
 Bobby Smith (footballer, born 1953) (1953–2010), Scottish footballer for Hibernian and Leicester City
 Rob Smith (soccer) (born 1973), American soccer player who was a member of the U.S. soccer team at the 1996 Summer Olympics

Australian rules football
 Bob Smith (Australian footballer, born 1877) (1877–1939), Australian rules footballer for Fitzroy
 Bob Smith (Australian footballer, born 1906) (1906–1987), Australian rules footballer for North Melbourne
 Rob Smith (Australian footballer) (1951–2013), Australian rules footballer for North Melbourne

Baseball
 Bob Smith (catcher) (born 1907), Negro league baseball player
 Bob Smith (infielder) (born 1974), infielder for the Tampa Bay Devil Rays
 Bob Smith (pitcher, born 1890) (1890–1965), Major League Baseball (MLB) pitcher for the White Sox, 1913–1915
 Bob Smith (pitcher, born 1895) (1895–1987), MLB pitcher for the Braves, Cubs, and Reds, 1923–1937
 Bob Smith (pitcher, born 1928) (1928–2003), MLB pitcher for the Red Sox, Cubs, and Indians, 1958–1959
 Bob Smith (pitcher, born 1931) (1931–2013), MLB pitcher for the Red Sox, Cardinals, Pirates, and Tigers, 1955–1959
 Bobby Smith (baseball) (1934–2015), MLB outfielder, 1957–1965
 Robert Smith (baseball) (1936–2021), International Baseball Federation president; instrumental in baseball becoming an Olympic sport
 Rob Smith (baseball), American college baseball coach

Basketball
 Bobby Smith (basketball) (1937–2020), American basketball player
 Bingo Smith (born 1946), American basketball player
 Robert Smith (basketball) (born 1955), American basketball player, NBA

Cricket
 Robert Smith (Australian cricketer) (1868–1927), Australian cricketer; played one first-class cricket match for Victoria in 1890
 Robert Smith (Derbyshire cricketer) (1848–1899), English cricketer; played first class cricket for Derbyshire 1871–84, captain 1876–83
 Robert Smith (South African cricketer) (1923–2001), South African cricketer
 Robert Smith (Wellington cricketer) (born 1946), New Zealand cricketer
 Robert Smith (Otago cricketer) (born 1974), Australian cricketer who played in New Zealand
 Robert Smith (Cumberland cricketer) (born 1982), English cricketer, played for Cumberland in 2001

Other sports

  Robert Augustus Smith (1869–1942), American racehorse trainer
 Robert Smith (boxer) (1908–?), South African Olympic boxer
 Bob Smith (rower) (1909–1993), New Zealand rower
 Bob Smith (1912–1994), American football, basketball, and baseball coach
 Robert Smith (canoeist) (1929–2001), Canadian sprint canoer who competed in the late 1950s
 Bob Smith (ice hockey) (born 1946), Canadian minor pro hockey player
 Bobby Smith (ice hockey) (born 1958), all-star NHL hockey player
 Rob Smith (field hockey) (born 1961), Canadian field hockey Olympian
 Robert Smith (equestrian) (born 1961), British Olympic equestrian
 Robert Smith (bowler) (born 1974), American professional bowler
 Bobby Smith (javelin thrower) (born 1982), American javelin thrower
 Robby Smith (born 1987), American Greco-Roman wrestler
 Rob Smith (racing driver) (born 1992), British racing driver
 Robbie Smith (rugby union) (born 1998), Scottish rugby union player
 Robert J. Smith (sailor) in 1973 Star World Championships
 Robert Smith (sport shooter), English sport shooter

Others
 Robert Smith (mathematician) (1689–1768), English mathematician and music theorist
 Robert Smith (architect) (1722–1777), American architect
 Robert Cross Smith (1795–1832), English astrologer
 Robert Smith (trade unionist) (1862–1934), general secretary of the National Union of Scottish Mineworkers
 Robert William Smith (politician) (1871–1958), New Zealand politician
 Robert Smith (colonial administrator) (1887–1959), British governor of North Borneo
 Robert Emmet Smith (1914–1988), American art director
 Robert L. Smith (judge) (1918–1999), Nebraska Supreme Court judge
 Robert Smith (professor) (1919–2009), expert on the history of the Yoruba people of Nigeria
 Robert Solwin Smith (1924–2013), American ambassador to the Côte d'Ivoire
 Robert J. Smith (anthropologist) (1927–2016), Cornell University anthropologist, president of Association for Asian Studies
 Robert P. Smith (ambassador) (1929–2012), American diplomat
 Robert H. T. Smith (born 1935), Australian-Canadian professor of geography who was president pro tempore of the University of British Columbia in  1985
 Robert Ellis Smith (1940–2018), American attorney and author
 Robert Smith, Baron Smith of Kelvin (born 1944), British businessman, governor of the BBC
 Robert S. Smith (born 1944), New York State Court of Appeals associate judge
 Robert Bruce Smith IV (1945–2014), American music and history expert
 Robert C. Smith (political scientist) (born 1947), political science professor at San Francisco State University 
 Robert J. A. Smith (born 1951), chairman of the Richmond Local History Society in Richmond, London
 Robert W. Smith (chess player) (born 1956), New Zealand chess FIDE Master
 Bob and Roberta Smith (born 1963), pseudonym for British artist Patrick Brill
 Robert Smith (journalist, born 1967), correspondent for National Public Radio (NPR)
 Robert Smith (journalist, born 1940), journalist for The New York Times
 Bobby Smith (activist) (born 1982), British political and fathers' rights activist
 Robert W. Smith (historian), scholar of history and the classics at the University of Alberta
 Rob Smith (journalist), BBC South East TV presenter
 Robert L. Smith (academic), American engineer, academic and author

See also
 Robert Smyth (disambiguation)
 Robert H. Smith School of Business, University of Maryland business school
 Robert Smit (died 1977), murdered South African politician
 Roberts-Smith (disambiguation)